Lynn Bianchi (born 1944) is an American fine art photographer and multimedia artist best known for her nude photographic series Heavy In White.

Born in 1944 in Pittsburgh, Pennsylvania, Lynn Bianchi is a fine art photographer and multimedia artist who has shown her work in over thirty solo exhibitions and in museums worldwide.

Collections 
Bianchi's work resides in private collections, including Manfred Heiting's and Edward Norton's, in museum collections, including Museum of Fine Arts in Houston, Texas, Brooklyn Museum in New York, Bibliothèque Nationale de France in Paris, Musée Ken Damy in Brescia, Italy, 21c Museum in Louisville, Kentucky, etc. Currently Lynn Bianchi resides in New York City and is working in the field of video art.

References 

American photographers
1944 births
Living people